Honor Found in Decay is the tenth studio album by American band Neurosis, released on October 30, 2012. The album is notable for incorporating elements of folk music while furthering the heaviness that was emphasized on Neurosis' previous album, Given to the Rising. Honor Found in Decay was lauded by Sputnikmusic for being "as challenging and engrossing a record as they have ever produced and an incredible celebration of the band's legendary career".  Guitarist and vocalist Steve Von Till cautioned that "if you're going put our record on, it's not going to be a party".

Overview
Considering the title of the album, Steve Von Till conceded that the band members cannot agree on its precise meaning, but "one thing that really resonates with me is that decay is the natural state of all things over time...When shit's falling apart, that is when you see the people who have honor and will stand by what they said, or those that are self-serving or dishonorable and stab people in the back".

Von Till characterized the band's development from Given to the Rising to Honor Found in Decay as focusing upon flow by contrasting harmony and disharmony.  Writing for Decibel Magazine, Brent Burton noted that Honor Found in Decay "marks the first time Neurosis have successfully incorporated the songwriterly tendencies of Scott Kelly and Steve Von Till's solo careers.  Folksy, but still explosively heavy".

As Von Till explained, "I always see our evolution as spiralling inward towards a core; we're constantly getting purer and purer; to the essence of what our music is supposed to be."  Von Till, noting that Neurosis' objective is to outdo its past efforts results, describes how this drive affects Neurosis' more recent albums:

The interplay between harmony and dissonance was noted by several publications, with The Quietus describing Honor Found in Decay as "hideously punishing...yet beautiful".

Songwriting and recording
Elements of the album dated back to the end of the songwriting process for the previous album, Given to the Rising. Scott Kelly explained that the band continued to "overwrite and then start subtracting [elements]...As far back as I can remember, there's always been an initial sort of reflection on where we were with the previous record and what we feel like doing, where we feel like we could be better.  We sort of let that settle in and then let the music go as it wishes".  Von Till explained that the lengthy songwriting process, which took over 5 years, was important to achieving the end result: "For these songs, we had to kind of let them reconstitute themselves or transform into a new shape over time...It's basically finding the opportunities to surrender ourselves to that kind of tangible spirit that drives everything we do".

Honour Found in Decay continued the band's working relationship with producer Steve Albini.  The band spent 10 days in the studio, which was described by Von Till as "luxurious" in comparison with the 6 days allotted to the studio for Given to the Rising.  Von Till described the relationship with Albini as fitting naturally with the approach and intent of Neurosis:

As Von Till explained, "People think that our music is very dense and complicated and layered, and that may be true in the way it's perceived, but it's just a single take of a band playing".  Significantly, even the keyboard parts are played live in the studio, with The Quietus noting that the "interplay between electronics and amps is comparatively untouchable." Spin noted that "here more than on any previous Neurosis LP, he [Noah Landis] commandeers his bandmates' sustained chords and snail-paced tempos and fills the space with smartly tinted textures," which reference Joy Division, Ennio Morricone, and Jarboe.

Artwork
The cover artwork features a totem with three arrows.  This emblem, Von Till suggests,  "represents the whole [that] is greater than the individual, the unity within a group creates more stability and more strength, which is definitely true of Neurosis".  The totem itself is based on ancient arrowheads.  Throughout the album's booklet, methods of communication interact with ancient symbols in order to illustrate the

Von Till explained that the artwork, with its "whole vibe of obsession, or meditation, or offerings" intentionally does not tell "an exact story", but rather "just hints at things - I think it’s a perfect visual space for people to trip on while they’re listening to the album."  Scott Kelly elaborated upon Von Till's perspective, further delineating the story expressed in the artwork: "we started to build this room that was for this isolated person in a possibly post-apocalyptic setting, or after everything has broken down, trying to find his place.  And the cover itself is his altar, his place where his spirit lives".

Reception

According to Metacritic, the album received "universal acclaim" based on 20 critics.

Pitchfork praised the album for not "abandon[ing] the moody sprawl of the band's last few full-lengths" while "help[ing] restore urgency to an aesthetic that seemed in danger of growing soporific. It's become common to refer to Neurosis as post-metal, as if the band had outgrown the primal allure of the riff. Honor refutes that idea. It's a record that proves these grizzled artisans still know how to flex their muscles."

The Guardian also praised the band for the balance struck on Honor Found in Decay: "In less skilful hands, this relentless sonic oppression would be gruelling, but by expressing human frailty with such visceral abandon, Neurosis have once again turned darkness into euphoria."  Similarly, Popmatters observed an equilibrium between "emotional complexity" and being "resoundingly heavy, with unguarded truth being just as important as thick atmospherics or colossal riffs."

Track listing

Personnel

Neurosis
 Scott Kelly − vocals, guitars
 Steve Von Till − vocals, guitars
 Dave Edwardson − bass guitar, backing vocals
 Noah Landis − synthesizer, organ, piano, samples, backing vocals
 Jason Roeder − drums
 Josh Graham − visual artist

Additional musicians
 Greg Dale − narration on "Bleeding the Pigs"
 Anna Brown − narration on "My Heart for Deliverance"

Technical personnel
 John Golden − mastering
 Steve Albini − recording
 Josh Graham − artwork

Charts

References

2012 albums
Neurosis (band) albums
Neurot Recordings albums
Albums produced by Steve Albini